Atropsocus is a genus of common barklice in the family Psocidae. There is one described species in Atropsocus, A. atratus.

References

Psocidae
Articles created by Qbugbot